Velizhsky Uyezd (Велижский уезд) was one of the eleven subdivisions of the Vitebsk Governorate of the Russian Empire. It was situated in the southeastern part of the governorate. Its administrative centre was Velizh.

Demographics
At the time of the Russian Empire Census of 1897, Velizhsky Uyezd had a population of 100,079. Of these, 85.7% spoke Belarusian, 9.8% Yiddish, 2.5% Latvian, 1.3% Russian, 0.3% Polish, 0.1% German and 0.1% Romani as their native language.

References

 
Uezds of Vitebsk Governorate